Gioconda Vessichelli is an Italian opera singer and actress.

Life and career
Gioconda is the inventor and pioneer of BollywoOPERA style. She sang in the Bollywood movie Prague in 2013, and gave her voice for the Bollywood movie Mary Kom in "Ziddi dil" along with Vishal Dadlani. On 19 May 2017 her song "Itni si baat hai" was released by Asia's biggest label, T-series. On 14 February came a further release with the same label, "That's amore", whose concept and typical gestural expressiveness soon became viral right across India, so that the song soon hit more than one million views. In December 2019 her revolutionary song "Contigo Bom Bom" was released, which led to her introducing raggaeton in India for the first time ever, and the "Bom Bom Challenge " soon got popular in the social media. On 20 December 2014 the song "Thodi Daaru" was released featuring Mika Singh.  Gioconda has performed live on a number of occasions resulting in the first-ever recorded fusion between opera and classical Hindi music with artists such as Grammy Award winner Sukhwinder Singh, Sajid Wajid, Mika Singh, Hari Haran, Loy Mendoza, Gino Banks, Niladri Kumar, Silvaganesha, and in festivals and auditoriums such as the like Nehru Centre[20] in Mumbai, the Antewerpen State Theatre Belgium, the City of Chicago, and also the Lavasa Festival, etc. On 31 March 2016 her international video "We are one" in which she sings and acts together with Anoop Jalota for world peace was launched by India's Prime Minister in Delhi. She was the only international member of the jury of Miss India Worldwide, held in 2014 in Pune, in which she also performed the song "Pyar Hua Iqraar" in an opera version of her own creation. She was an international judge along with Indian singer Amruta Fadnavis for "The Queen of Mashups" contest. On 2 December 2017 she is as well International judge along with Bappi Lahiri and Meenakshi Seshadri at the Zeetv International Indian Icon talent competition in Chicago and on 25 December 2017 she is an international judge at Asia's biggest music festival, "Mood Indigo", along with Amit Trivedi. In January 2018 she does lectures on music along with her live examples of singing and performing techniques for the great movie director Subhash Ghai's International School of film and music "Whistlingwoods" together with singer Ankit Tiwari and other exponents of the Bollywood industry."Fear Curbs Your Inner Talent" said Composer-Singer Ankit Tiwari at the 5th Veda Cultural Workshop at Whistling Woods International - INDIAN NEWS & TIMES : INDIAN NEWS & TIMES

She is in the annual book of Italian opera singers for having sung in the first world edition of contemporary opera at "Teatro comunale di Modena", broadcast on RAI's (Italy's radio and television state company) radio channels. Gioconda is the first singer in the premiere world ever of Matteo D'Amico's contemporary opera "Lavinia fuggita". She owns two degrees in opera singing and musicology from Italian conservatory "Santa Cecilia" and the international high school of opera "H.Wolf". Tenor Luciano Pavarotti was her teacher, among other opera singers who selected her as one of their best students. She was selected as best singer at accademia rossiniana in Pesaro and she debuts the role of "Madama cortese" in Rossini's "il viaggio a Reims" with Rof symphonic orchestra at Rossini theatre in Pesaro. She sings again in a Rossini opera at Ercolano during an international opera season in "Il barbiere di Siviglia" and at teatro Politeama opera season in Lecce. After Rossini she debuts "Carmen" by Bizet. Her interpretation of the role "Mimì" in Puccini's "La Boheme" was very positively received.

As early as 2007 she was invited to the "Venice Awards" to sing for composer grammy award winner Ennio Morricone with the programme being broadcast on RAI (Italian State television).

She works with choreographer and director Linsday Kemp and conductor David Haughton for Benjamin Britten's "A Midsummer night's dream" at Teatro del Giglio in Lucca and later in teatro Verdi in Pisa and Teatro Goldoni in Livorno.

She has worked with the great conductor Antonio Pappano, currently director of the Orchestra dell'Accademia Nazionale di Santa Cecilia, in Rome.

She is singer and also director in the opera Tosca at the international festival "Quattro notti" in Benevento, and the next year at the same festival she makes her debut as an actress also and not only as just a singer in "La Vedova Allegra" by Lehar and as actress and singer again, along with legendary soprano Katia Ricciarelli, in "Orfeo all'inferno" by Offenbach at Teatro Lirico di Cagliari as well as in Christmas Carol with choir and orchestra also with the famous violinist Uto Ughi and the famous actor Michele Placido and in Germany she sings not only Italian opera arias but she is also specialized in Lieder at international chamber music academy "H. Wolf".

She supports the women's cause in a Puccini concert with all love opera songs devoted to women, she supports Aids researche through a concert in French Polynesia / Tahiti (Papeete) where she is honorary Citizen also aired in radio, as a musicologist she has a deep interest in fusion which has led her to perform in several concerts among which the one in Santa Cecilia Auditorium in Rome with the Italian jazz man Renzo Arbore and with the great conductor Antonio Pappano.

She was the first real opera singer in the world to make a fusion between opera and Hindi music and for that she received the Indian Women Award first time ever given to a non Indian woman.

She has received various invitations from Bollywood industry to give not only her voice but also her presence as a special western opera actress in Bollywood movies, but up to now she is only focused on music. Recently she has accepted to feature, together with Mika Singh as a dancer, in a special Latino passionate style in Dilbagh Singh's video "Bottoms up" released in April 2015. She is involved in several philanthropic projects and for that she got the noble chivalric title of "Dame" from Royal House. She won the Norman International Academy medal for her artistic career, and she got the honorary membership by several cultural Institutions as she started singing opera as a child prodigy. She sings in the following languages: Italian, English, Hindi, Punjabi, French, German, Spanish, Bulgarian, Albanian, Russian, Latin, Portuguese. She can also speak seven languages (English, Hindi, Spanish, French, Italian, Latin, Portuguese).

Television

Roles

Albums

Movies in which Gioconda sung
 2013 movie "Prague", music composer and singer, song "Touch opera", label Universal
 2014 "Mary Kom" singer, music composer Sashi Suman, song "Ziddi dil" together with Vishal Dadlani, label Zee music
 2015 "Kahin toh hoga", music director Raaj Aashoo, song "Rabba"
2016 "Like a prayer", music director Gioconda Vessichelli, Naveen Kumar label Sony
2017 "Itni si baat hai", music composer Gioconda Vessichelli label Tseries
2018 "That's amore", music composer concept and video director Gioconda Vessichelli label Tseries
2019 "Telephone Call", music composer Ved Sharma.

Awards

She is the winner of the following international opera competitions:
 "Anemos, 1998"
 "Napolinova 1999"
 "Alaleona 2000"
 "Mario Lanza 2001"
 "Albanese 2002"
 "Città di Cagli 2005"
 "Leoncavallo 2013".

She is finalist at International Opera Competitions "Rosetum-Scala"

References

External links 

Living people
Singers from Rome
Actresses from Rome
Italian women singers
Italian opera singers
Bollywood playback singers
Italian film actresses
Italian television actresses
Italian expatriates in India
Expatriate musicians in India
European actresses in India
Actresses of European descent in Indian films
21st-century Italian actresses
21st-century Italian singers
21st-century Italian women singers
Year of birth missing (living people)